Pit Stop is a 2013 American drama film directed by Yen Tan. The film tells the story of two gay men in a small town in Texas.

Plot introduction
The majority of the film involves the men's past relationships and struggles of being gay in a small Southern town.

Cast
The film stars Bill Heck and Marcus DeAnda as Gabe and Ernesto, the protagonists. The film also stars Amy Seimetz as Gabe's ex-wife Shannon and Alfredo Maduro as Ernesto's former partner Luis, both of whom are still involved in their ex-partners' lives.

Premiere
Pit Stop premiered at the 2013 Sundance Film Festival. It was released digitally on January 7, 2014, and on DVD on February 4, 2014, by Wolfe Releasing.

Awards
The film won the Texas Grand Jury Prize at the 2013 Dallas International Film Festival and the Louise LeQuire Award for Best Screenplay at the 2013 Nashville Film Festival.

References

External links
 

2013 films
2013 drama films
2013 LGBT-related films
American drama films
American LGBT-related films
Films directed by Yen Tan
Gay-related films
LGBT-related drama films
2010s English-language films
2010s American films